In United States Army units, a Headquarters and Headquarters Company (HHC) is a company-sized military unit, found at the battalion level and higher. Considered one unit, a Headquarters and Headquarters Company is essentially two elements within one company. In identifying a specific headquarters unit, it is usually referred to by its abbreviation as an HHC. While a regular line company is formed of three or four platoons, an HHC is made up of the headquarters staff and headquarters support personnel of a battalion, brigade, division, or higher level unit. As these personnel do not fall inside one of the regular line companies of the battalion, brigade, or division, the HHC is the unit to which they are administratively assigned. The typical personnel strength of an average HHC is 80 to 110.

Inside a battalion HHC, the headquarters staff will usually include the following key officers and primary staff:

Depending on the unit, extra support officers will round out the staff, including a medical officer, Judge Advocate General's Corps (legal) officer, and a battalion chaplain (often collectively referred to as the "special staff"), as well as essential non-commissioned officers and enlisted support personnel in the occupational specialties of the staff sections (S1 through S4 and the S6). The battalion command sergeant major is the principal advisor to the battalion commander on matters regarding enlisted personnel. Additionally, the HHC will contain further personnel assigned to support and sustain the mission of the battalion headquarters, including maintenance and motor pool, field mess, and supply, as well as the battalion Reconnaissance Platoon of infantry scouts and snipers and a Mortar Platoon. 

The Headquarters element consists of the Battalion Commander, the Executive Officer, the Command Sergeant Major and supporting staff. The Headquarters Company element will be commanded by a company commander (usually a captain) who is supported by a company executive officer (usually a first lieutenant) and a company first sergeant. All personnel in the HHC fall under the administrative command of the HHC company commander, but in practice, the primary and special staff officers and noncommissioned officers operationally report to the battalion commander, and while the battalion commander is administratively assigned to the HHC, he or she is the HHC company commander's higher command and thus the HHC company commander operationally answers directly to the battalion commander. The mission of the HHC company commander is to run the administrative and soldier training aspects of the HHC, and to support the battalion primary staff by facilitating the environment in which they operate and in turn support the battalion commander in commanding the battalion. While the Headquarters Company Commander has administrative authority over the battalion commander's staff officers and NCOs, the Headquarters Company Commander's operational authority is limited to requirements derived from exercising the HHC's mission essential task list (METL) through related collective training requirements that facilitate the battalion commander's command post, in addition to achieving required individual training: "...ensuring that both Soldiers and equipment are in the proper state of readiness at all times".

At the brigade and division level, an HHC is similarly constituted of the brigade commander or division commander, his or her staff, and the support elements, but the ranks of the staff and support personnel are typically greater to reflect the greater level of responsibility at higher echelon units. However, the company commander of a brigade or division Headquarters Company is usually still a captain.

In keeping with the army's long-standing practice of referring to company-sized artillery units as "batteries" and company-sized cavalry units as "troops," the headquarters company element of an artillery battalion or higher is referred to as a headquarters and headquarters battery, or HHB, and the headquarters company element of a cavalry squadron or higher is referred to as a headquarters and headquarters troop, or HHT. Additionally, some high-level headquarters elements for special units are not company-sized and are referred to as "detachments"; as a result, these units are formally referred to as headquarters and headquarters detachments, or HHD.

See also
 Units, formations, and commands
 Staff officer
 Headquarters and Service Company

References

Military units and formations by type
Companies of the United States Army